USS Restless is a name used more than once by the U.S. Navy:

 , a barque commissioned during the American Civil War.
 Restless, a steam tug, built at St. Louis in 1861, was transferred by the War Department to the Navy on 30 September 1862 and renamed Mistletoe.
 , a schooner-rigged yacht.
 , a patrol gunboat launched 21 February 1940.

United States Navy ship names